The 1974 Taça de Portugal Final was the final match of the 1973–74 Taça de Portugal, the 34th season of the Taça de Portugal, the premier Portuguese football cup competition organized by the Portuguese Football Federation (FPF). The match was played on 9 June 1974 at the Estádio Nacional in Oeiras, and opposed two Primeira Liga sides: Benfica and Sporting CP. Sporting CP defeated Benfica 2–1 to claim a ninth Taça de Portugal.

Match

Details

References

1974
Taca
S.L. Benfica matches
Sporting CP matches